Xinjiang ground jay (Podoces biddulphi) or Biddulph's ground jay, is a species of bird in the family Corvidae. It is endemic to China. It is not larger than an adult human's hand and has a brownish white coat of feathers.

Since 2004, the International Union for Conservation of Nature (IUCN) has listed the jay's conservation status as "Near Threatened" due to habitat fragmentation and degradation.

References

Xinjiang ground jay
Birds of Western China
Endemic birds of China
Xinjiang ground jay
Taxonomy articles created by Polbot